Duke Udi (born 5 May 1976) is a Nigerian former football player.

Career 
Udi started his career with Concord FC in 1993 and was part of the Shooting Stars F.C. team that won the Nigeria Premier League in 1995.
He then moved to Grasshopper Club in Switzerland and played in the 1995–96 UEFA Champions League.

In 2002, he featured in the Russian league with FC Krylia Sovetov Samara. 2006 features for Lobi Stars F.C. before staging a return to Shooting Stars. On 28 August 2008,he left Akwa United F.C. and returned to Niger Tornadoes.

After earning a coaching license in the United States, he was hired to coach Giwa F.C. in July 2014.

International 
He played on international stage for Nigeria, with his last game in the 2002 World Cup Qualifiers.`

References

External links

PFC Krylia Sovetov Samara players
Nigerian footballers
Shooting Stars S.C. players
Hapoel Rishon LeZion F.C. players
Expatriate footballers in Israel
ŠK Slovan Bratislava players
Slovak Super Liga players
Nigeria international footballers
Association football midfielders
Nigerian expatriate footballers
Grasshopper Club Zürich players
Enyimba F.C. players
1976 births
Living people
Plateau United F.C. players
Akwa United F.C. players
Lobi Stars F.C. players
Kwara United F.C. players
Sunshine Stars F.C. players
Niger Tornadoes F.C. players
Expatriate footballers in Slovakia
Expatriate footballers in Russia
Russian Premier League players
Giwa F.C. managers
Nigerian football managers